In mathematics, Schinzel's hypothesis H is one of the most famous open problems in the topic of number theory. It is a very broad generalization of widely open conjectures such as the twin prime conjecture. The hypothesis is named after Andrzej Schinzel.

Statement
The hypothesis claims that for every finite collection  of nonconstant irreducible polynomials over the integers with positive leading coefficients, one of the following conditions holds:

 There is an integer  (called a fixed divisor) which always divides the product . (Or, equivalently: There exists a prime  such that for every  there is an  such that  divides .)

It is easy to see that this condition prevents the first condition from being true. Schinzel's hypothesis essentially claims that condition 2 is the only way condition 1 can fail to hold.

One can see by extrapolating with finite differences that this divisor will also divide all other values of  too.

Schinzel's hypothesis builds on the earlier Bunyakovsky conjecture, for a single polynomial, and on the Hardy–Littlewood conjectures and Dickson's conjecture for multiple linear polynomials.  It is in turn extended by the Bateman–Horn conjecture.

Examples

has no fixed prime divisor. We therefore expect that there are infinitely many primes

This has not been proved, though. It was one of Landau's conjectures and goes back to Euler, who observed in a letter to Goldbach in 1752 that  is often prime for  up to 1500.

The hypothesis then implies the existence of infinitely many twin primes, a basic and notorious open problem.

Variants
As proved by Schinzel and Sierpiński in page 188 of  
it is equivalent to the following: if condition 2 does not hold, then there exists at least one positive integer  such that all  will be simultaneously prime, for any choice of irreducible integral polynomials  with positive leading coefficients.

If the leading coefficients were negative, we could expect negative prime values; this is a harmless restriction.

Previous results
The special case of a single linear
polynomial is Dirichlet's theorem on arithmetic progressions, one of the most important results of
number theory. In fact, this special case is the only known instance of Schinzel's Hypothesis H. We do not
more than one polynomial.

Almost prime approximations to Schinzel's Hypothesis have been attempted by many mathematicians; among them, most notably,
Chen's theorem states that there exist infinitely many prime numbers  such that  is either a prime or a semiprime 
 
Skorobogatov  and Sofos have proved that almost all polynomials of any fixed degree satisfy Schinzel's hypothesis H. 

If there is a hypothetical probabilistic density sieve, using the  DHR sieve can prove the Schinzel's hypothesis H in all cases by mathematical recursion.

Prospects and applications

The hypothesis is probably not accessible with current methods in analytic number theory, but is now quite often used to prove conditional results, for example in Diophantine geometry. This connection is due to Jean-Louis Colliot-Thélène and Jean-Jacques Sansuc. For further explanations and references on this connection
see the notes   of Swinnerton-Dyer.
The conjectural result being so strong in nature, it is possible that it could be shown to be too much to expect.

Extension to include the Goldbach conjecture

The hypothesis doesn't cover Goldbach's conjecture, but a closely related version (hypothesis HN) does. That requires an extra polynomial , which in the Goldbach problem would just be , for which

N − F(n)

is required to be a prime number, also. This is cited in Halberstam and Richert, Sieve Methods. The conjecture here takes the form of a statement when N is sufficiently large, and subject to the condition

has no fixed divisor > 1. Then we should be able to require the existence of n such that N − F(n) is both positive and a prime number; and with all the fi(n) prime numbers.

Not many cases of these conjectures are known; but there is a detailed quantitative theory (Bateman–Horn conjecture).

Local analysis

The condition of having no fixed prime divisor is purely local (depending just on primes, that is).  In other words, a finite set of irreducible integer-valued polynomials 
with no local obstruction to taking infinitely many prime values is conjectured to take infinitely many prime values.

An analogue that fails

The analogous conjecture with the integers replaced by the one-variable polynomial ring over a finite field is false.  For example, Swan noted in 1962 (for reasons unrelated to Hypothesis H) that the polynomial

over the ring F2[u] is irreducible and has no fixed prime polynomial divisor (after all, its values at x = 0 and x = 1 are relatively prime polynomials) but all of its values as x runs over F2[u] are composite.  Similar examples can be found with F2 replaced by any finite field; the obstructions in a proper formulation of Hypothesis H over F[u], where F is a finite field, are no longer just local but a new global obstruction occurs with no classical parallel, assuming hypothesis H is in fact correct.

References

External links

Analytic number theory
Conjectures about prime numbers
Unsolved problems in number theory